Rivetina caucasica is a species of praying mantis in the family Rivetinidae.

It is found in the Caucasus region.

See also
List of mantis genera and species

References

C
Mantodea of Asia
Mantodea of Europe
Insects of Russia
Fauna of Georgia (country)
Insects described in 1871